Wallace Fenwick Knock (November 23, 1913 – February 11, 1988) was a Canadian curler. He was the lead on the 1951 Brier Champion team, skipped by Don Oyler.

References

Brier champions
1913 births
1988 deaths
Curlers from Nova Scotia
People from Lunenburg County, Nova Scotia
Canadian male curlers